The president of the Republic of The Gambia is the head of state and head of government of the Gambia. The president leads the executive branch of the government of the Gambia and is the commander-in-chief of the Gambia Armed Forces. The post was created in 1970, when the Gambia became a republic and has been held by three people: Dawda Jawara, who ruled from 1970 until 1994, Yahya Jammeh, who seized power in a bloodless coup that year and Adama Barrow, who defeated Jammeh in elections held in December 2016.

List of presidents

See also 

List of colonial governors of the Gambia
List of heads of government of the Gambia
Lists of office-holders

References 

Guinness Book of Kings, Rulers & Statesmen, Clive Carpenter, Guinness Superlatives Ltd
African States and Rulers, John Stewart, McFarland

External links 

Official Website
http://www.rulers.org/rulg1.html#gambia

1970 establishments in the Gambia
 
History of the Gambia
Gambia

Heads of state